2030: The Real Story of What Happens to America is the first novel written by American actor and comedian Albert Brooks.

Synopsis
The story follows a diverse cast of characters in the year 2030, by which (hypothetical) time   
 cancer will have been cured 
 generational tension between the young and the old will have escalated, and 
 a "half-Jewish" president of the United States will have been elected (hamstrung by massive federal debt) and will also be challenged by:
a high-profile kidnapping of senior citizens
massive reconstruction of earthquake-devastated Los Angeles in partnership with China, and 
a constitutional amendment which could lead to a foreign-born president.

Development
According to Brooks, he "did an earlier version of the book as a script" but felt it would be too expensive to produce it as a futuristic film. The novel "is meant to be very plausible [...] I almost wanted the book to read like a news story. This is not a faraway America."

Brooks had already written "substantial portions of 2030" before pitching it to Elizabeth Beier, Brooks’s editor at St. Martin’s Press.

Reception
The book has received mostly positive reviews. Janet Maslin of The New York Times remarked that Brooks "made the nervy move of transposing his worrywart sensibility from film to book. Two things are immediately apparent about his debut novel: that it’s as purposeful as it is funny, and that Mr. Brooks has immersed himself deeply in its creation." Asking why Brooks' take should be taken seriously, Maslin answers, "his prognostications are not so farfetched for futuristic fiction; that he has worked them into a real novel, not a tricked-up movie treatment; and that a little humor goes a long way in this often bleak genre". But about the ending, "some events seem abrupt and artificial", and Brooks "doesn’t have the pitilessness it requires."

Kirkus Reviews summarized, "Actor Albert Brooks has fun imagining a world in the future—though not too far in the future to be wholly implausible" and "the tone is satiric, something Brooks usually does with a light touch, though occasionally he loses the playfulness and shows too heavy a hand."
 
Publishers Weekly called the novel a "smart and surprisingly serious debut", noted its "sweeping narrative", and classified it as "a novel as entertaining as it is thought provoking, like something from the imagination of a borscht belt H.G. Wells."

References

External links
2030, St Martin's Press page
Albert Brooks page

2011 American novels
Dystopian novels
American comedy novels
Fiction set in 2030
Novels set in the 2030s
Works by Albert Brooks
2011 debut novels
St. Martin's Press books